WSVH (91.1 FM) is a 96,000-watt public radio station broadcasting from Savannah, Georgia, and transmitting from the WVAN-TV 9 (GPB TV) tower to the west in Pembroke, Georgia, north of Fort Stewart.  It provides the radio service of Georgia Public Broadcasting (GPB) serves the upper Georgia coast and areas well inland, and adjacent areas of far southern South Carolina.

The station's signal is simulcast by GPB-owned WWIO-FM 88.9 in Brunswick, Georgia. Together, the two stations serve the entire Georgia coastline. Their signals can be heard from Beaufort, South Carolina to Fernandina Beach, Florida.

History

Georgia Public Radio, Inc. (of no relation to GPB) was formed by local residents to build a public radio station for Savannah after locals had occasionally received public stations in Charleston, South Carolina, and Jacksonville, Florida. The station began broadcasting on April 20, 1981, with the first piece played on the station at 6 a.m. being Aaron Copland's Fanfare for the Common Man.

In 1988, after surveying financial supporters, WSVH merged with Peach State Public Radio, the new state-owned service that had begun in 1985 to provide public radio to much of the unserved part of the state. In the early 1990s, the listening area was greatly improved with the addition of WWIO in extreme southeast Georgia; an overnight classical-music format was also added. In 1997, the station moved its studio from downtown Savannah to the Skidaway Institute of Oceanography on Skidaway Island, just south of Savannah.  In August 2011, the WSVH/WWIO studios moved again to space at the Armstrong Center of Armstrong State University.

In past years, WSVH was one of two member stations of the GPB Radio network to have local announcers and underwriting during the day. WSVH produced four radio programs for the GPB network: Celtic program The Green Island Radio Show with Harry O'Donoghue, folk show Music Americana with Russell Wells, "Classical Tonight", also hosted by Russell Wells, and the overnight classical block Coastal Nocturne.

See also
List of radio stations in Georgia (U.S. state)

References

External links
 Georgia Public Broadcasting
 WSVH webpage

 WWIO webpage

NPR member stations
SVH
Radio stations established in 1981
1981 establishments in Georgia (U.S. state)